Gioia del Colle Air Base   is an Italian Air Force (Aeronautica Militare) base located in the province of Bari, Apulia, Italy,  located approximately 1 km south-southeast of Gioia del Colle.

World War II
During World War II the air base was captured by the British Eighth Army in October 1943 and subsequently used by the United States Army Air Forces Twelfth Air Force and Fifteenth Air Force.  It was known as Gioia del Colle Airfield by the Americans.  Known combat units operating from the airfield were:
 1st Fighter Group, 8 December 1943 – 8 January 1944, P-38 Lightning
 57th Fighter Group, 25–30 September 1943, P-40 Warhawk
 451st Bombardment Group, 10 January-5 March 1944 B-24 Liberator
 464th Bombardment Group, 21 April 1944 - 1 June 1944 B-24 Liberator

The airfield was also used by troop carrier units working with British paratroopers (8th Troop Carrier Squadron) as well as by Air Technical Service Command as a maintenance and supply depot. (41st/38th Air Depot).    It was turned over to the Allied Italian Co-Belligerent Air Force (Aviazione Cobelligerante Italiana, or ACI) in September 1945.

Present
The base is an Italian military facility, presently home of the 36th Stormo, flying the Eurofighter Typhoon.

If necessary, the base can host personnel and aircraft of both the Italian Air Force, as well as other nations in NATO.

As part of the Coalition intervention in Libya, resulting from the 2011 Libyan civil war and the subsequent enforcement of United Nations Security Council Resolution 1973, it became the forward operating base for units of the Royal Air Force, operating both Panavia Tornado GR4 and Eurofighter Typhoon aircraft.

See also

List of airports in Italy

Notes

References

 Maurer, Maurer. Air Force Combat Units of World War II. Maxwell AFB, Alabama: Office of Air Force History, 1983. .
 
  USAFHRA document search Gioia del Colle Airfield

External links

Italian Air Force
Aeronautica Militare
Italian airbases
Airfields of the United States Army Air Forces in Italy
Airports established in 1915
Airports in Apulia
Gioia del Colle